Alexander Karageorgevitch (born 15 January 1982), also known as Prince Alexander of Serbia and Yugoslavia or Prince Aleksandar III Karađorđević, is a member of the House of Karađorđević. He is the third and youngest grandchild of the last Yugoslav king, Peter II.

Early life and education
Alexander is the third and youngest child of the last crown prince of Yugoslavia, Alexander, and his first wife, Princess Maria da Gloria of Orléans-Braganza. He is the fraternal twin of Prince Philip. His godparents are Queen Sofía of Spain, King Constantine II of Greece (first cousins of his father), and Princess Anne, Duchess of Calabria (first cousin of his mother). Besides his twin brother, he has an older brother, Peter (b. 1980). Alexander lived in Virginia until 1984. In 1982, Alexander and his twin brother were baptized by Lavrentije, Serbian Orthodox Bishop of Western Europe, at a castle in Villamanrique de la Condesa, near Seville, Spain.

Alexander's parents divorced in 1985. After the divorce, his father married Katherine Clairy Batis later that year, while his mother married Ignacio, 19th Duke of Segorbe in the same year. Through his mother, Alexander has two younger half-sisters, Sol María de la Blanca Medina y Orléans-Braganza, 54th Countess of Ampurias (b. 1986) and Ana Luna Medina y Orléans-Braganza, 17th Countess of Ricla (b. 1988).

Alexander was educated in London and Canterbury with his twin brother. In June 2000, he completed sixth form at The King's School, Canterbury. He was awarded a BA degree in Communications and Media from the University of San Francisco in 2004. Alexander was at a graduate school at an American university completing a MFA degree in advertising (Art Direction).

Personal life 
Prince Alexander attended the reburial of his grandparents King Peter II and Queen Alexandra, grand-grandmother Queen Maria, and granduncle Prince Andrew in the Royal Family Mausoleum at Oplenac on 26 May 2013. The Serbian Royal Regalia were placed over King Peter's coffin, having Alexander placing a diamond sabre near to the Karađorđević Crown.

In 2014, Alexander moved to Belgrade, Serbia. In 2015, Alexander dated Dunja Kusturica, a daughter of Serbian filmmaker and musician Emir Kusturica. At the time, their relationship was compared to one of Kate and Prince William by Serbian media. In 2015, he owned a bar in Belgrade. On 17 July 2015, Prince Alexander and his brothers were present at their father's 70th birthday celebration in Belgrade. The event gathered 400 guests, including Carl XVI Gustaf of Sweden and Albert II of Monaco among others.

Arms

Ancestors
Alexander is a member of the House of Karađorđević. Through his father, Alexander descends from kings Nicholas I of Montenegro, Ferdinand I of Romania, and Alexander of Greece, and furthermore from emperors Nicholas I of Russia and Frederick III of the Germans and Queen Victoria of the United Kingdom of Great Britain and Ireland. In 2010, several sources reported that he was among the top 100 in the line of succession to the British throne.

Through his mother, Alexander descends from the Emperor Pedro II of Brazil, and kings Louis Philippe I of France and Francis I of the Two Sicilies, and furthermore from Francis I, Holy Roman Emperor and king Charles III of Spain.

References

External links
Biography of Prince Alexander at the Royal Family of Serbia Official Website

1982 births
Living people
American people of Serbian descent
American people of Portuguese descent
American people of Brazilian descent
People from Fairfax, Virginia
Karageorgevich, Prince Alexander
Karađorđević dynasty
People educated at The King's School, Canterbury
Serbian expatriates in Spain
Serbian expatriates in the United Kingdom
Serbian people of Danish descent
Serbian people of English descent
Serbian people of German descent
Serbian people of French descent
Serbian people of Portuguese descent
Serbian people of Brazilian descent